This is a list of members of the South Australian Legislative Council from 1930 to 1933.

 The Australian Labor Party split in August 1931 over the Cabinet's support for the Premiers' Plan as a response to the Great Depression. The state conference of the party expelled all 23 Labor MPs who had voted for the plan, including two of their four MLCs - James Jelley and Stanley Whitford. Jelley and Whitford both joined their expelled House of Assembly colleagues in forming the separate Parliamentary Labor Party. The two remaining MLCs, Frank Condon and Tom Gluyas, remained in the official Labor Party.
 Labor MLC Tom Gluyas died on 3 September 1931. Independent candidate Joseph Anderson won the resulting by-election on 24 October.
 LCL MLC Sir Lancelot Stirling died on 24 May 1932. Reuben Cranstoun Mowbray was elected unopposed to the vacancy on 17 June.
 The two conservative parties, the Liberal Federation and the state branch of the Country Party, merged to create the new Liberal and Country League on 9 June 1932.

References
Parliament of South Australia — Statistical Record of the Legislature

Members of South Australian parliaments by term
20th-century Australian politicians